Gari is a village in the municipality of Kruševac, Serbia. According to the 2002 census, the village has a population of  535 people.

References

Populated places in Rasina District
Villages in Serbia
Kruševac